José Carlos Schmidt, also known as Zeca Schmidt, is a Brazilian former professional tennis player.

Schmidt, who played collegiate tennis at Florida State University, won a bronze medal for Brazil at the 1975 Pan American Games, partnering João Soares in the men's doubles.

While competing on the professional tour he won three Challenger doubles titles with Thomaz Koch and the pair were doubles finalists at a Grand Prix tournament in Itaparica in 1982, but had to retire in the second set. His career high doubles ranking was 82 in the world.

Brazilian Davis Cup player Ricardo Bernd is his cousin.

Grand Prix career finals

Doubles: 1 (0–1)

Challenger titles

Doubles: (3)

References

External links
 
 

Year of birth missing (living people)
Living people
Brazilian male tennis players
Florida State Seminoles men's tennis players
Tennis players at the 1975 Pan American Games
Pan American Games bronze medalists for Brazil
Pan American Games medalists in tennis
Brazilian expatriate sportspeople in the United States
Medalists at the 1975 Pan American Games